Mark Stuart is the name of:

 Mark Stuart (ice hockey) (born 1984), ice hockey player in the National Hockey League
 Mark Stuart (musician) (born 1968), former lead singer of Christian rock band Audio Adrenaline
 Mark Stuart (footballer) (born 1966), English footballer
 Mark Stuart, singer, guitarist and half of the duo Stacey Earle and Mark Stuart
 Mark Stuart, leader of country band Bastard Sons of Johnny Cash

See also
 Mark Stewart (disambiguation)